Pakistan Army Museum is an army museum located in Rawalpindi. It was opened on October 24, 1961 to preserve Pakistan Army's past through relics and pictures and is one of the largest museums of Pakistan.

Location and contents
The museum also contains rare pieces of old-time arms and uniforms to depict transformation of military forces. Some of the surviving Sherman tanks are a part of the museum's display. Pakistan Army Museum is located in the British-era colonial barracks of the Pakistan Army's General Headquarters (GHQ) complex of buildings. It is a must-see for weaponry and war history enthusiasts. This museum displays arms and ammunition from the Mughal Era and all the way up to modern weapons. Detailed history of the evolution of the Pakistan Army is offered in the new museum building.

Global war on terrorism
A special gallery has been dedicated to the global war on terrorism and the Pakistan military's anti-terrorism operations in the tribal areas on Pakistan-Afghanistan border.

See also
List of museums in Pakistan

References

External links

Homepage Pakistan Army Museum, Rawalpindi

Museums in Punjab, Pakistan
Pakistan Army
Rawalpindi District
Army museums in Asia
1961 establishments in Pakistan
Museums established in 1961
Tourist attractions in Rawalpindi